Alfonso III (4 November 1265, in Valencia – 18 June 1291), called the Liberal (el Liberal) or the Free (also "the Frank," from el Franc), was the king of Aragon and Valencia, and count of Barcelona (as ) from 1285. He conquered the Kingdom of Majorca between his succession and 1287.

He was a son of King Peter III of Aragon and Constance, daughter and heiress of King Manfred of Sicily.

Soon after assuming the throne, he conducted a campaign to reincorporate the Balearic Islands into the Kingdom of Aragon – which had been lost due to the division of the kingdom by his grandfather, James I of Aragon. Thus in 1285 he declared war on his uncle, James II of Majorca, and conquered both Majorca (1285) and Ibiza (1286), effectively reassuming suzerainty over the Kingdom of Majorca. He followed this with the conquest of Menorca – until then, an autonomous Muslim state (Manûrqa) within the Kingdom of Majorca – on 17 January 1287, the anniversary of which now serves as Menorca's national holiday.

He initially sought to maintain Aragonese control over Sicily early in his reign by supporting the claims to the island of his brother, James II of Aragon. However, he later retracted the support for his brother shortly before his death and instead tried to make peace with the Papal States France.

His reign was marred by a constitutional struggle with the Aragonese nobles, which eventually culminated in the articles of the Union of Aragon – the so-called "Magna Carta of Aragon", which devolved several key royal powers into the hands of lesser nobles. His inability to resist the demands of his nobles was to leave a heritage of disunity in Aragon and further dissent amongst the nobility, who increasingly saw little reason to respect the throne, and brought the Kingdom of Aragon close to anarchy.

During his lifetime a dynastic marriage with Eleanor, daughter of King Edward I of England, was arranged. However Alfonso died before meeting his bride. He died at the age of 25 in 1291, and was buried in the Franciscan convent in Barcelona; since 1852 his remains have been buried in Barcelona Cathedral.

Dante Alighieri, in the Divine Comedy, recounts that he saw Alfonso's spirit seated outside the gates of Purgatory with the other monarchs whom Dante blamed for the chaotic political state of Europe during the 13th century.

References

1265 births
1291 deaths
13th-century Aragonese monarchs
People from Valencia
Counts of Barcelona
Valencian monarchs
House of Aragon
Burials at Barcelona Cathedral
People of the War of the Sicilian Vespers
Aragonese infantes